The 2021 West Northamptonshire Council election took place during 2021, alongside nationwide local elections. The election was originally due to take place in May 2020, but was postponed due to the COVID-19 pandemic.

A total of 93 councillors were elected, with the 31 wards electing 3 councillors each. The election was held concurrently with the Northamptonshire Police, Fire and Crime Commissioner election.

Results

Gains and losses calculated from nominal results of the 2017 Northamptonshire County Council election, which used the same electoral divisions.

This resulted in a Gallagher index score of 16.8, meaning the council is highly disproportionate.

Campaign

The election was initially supposed to occur in 2020, but was postponed due to the COVID-19 pandemic.

The Conservatives launched their campaign on 30 of March, declaring that the new Councils would "give everyone in Northamptonshire a fresh start." The Liberal Democrat campaign launch was delayed by the death of the Duke of Edinburgh and promised a "listening, caring and competent council."

There were several controversies during the campaign. The Conservatives were criticised for a mistake on a leaflet in Silverstone ward, which had not been adapted from the standard template. This caused embarrassment, as the stock promise was '[insert prominent local pledges here, e.g. save our libraries]' despite local anger at Conservative plans to close twenty-one libraries in the previous council. Conservatives, in turn, criticised the Liberal Democrats for a leaflet in the style of a tabloid newspaper, though the Labour Party and the Greens both defended the leaflet. The Labour candidate for Sixfields, Graham Croucher, was expelled from the party after standing against the official Labour candidate in the Northampton Town Council election.

Wards

Daventry

Northampton

South Northamptonshire

Notes

References

Council elections in Northamptonshire